BTS In the Soop (stylized as BTS In the SOOP) is a South Korean reality series created by Big Hit Entertainment and Big Hit Three Sixty, starring boy band BTS. The eight-episode first season premiered on August 19, 2020, on the South Korean pay television network JTBC and the online platform Weverse, and features the band taking a break from their busy lives in the city to spend a week together at a remote forest location where they relax and engage in various hobbies.

A second season, produced by Hybe 360, premiered on October 15, 2021, and follows the band as they spend four days at a private villa in the mountains. The version that aired on JTBC comprised four episodes. The Weverse version contained extended footage and spanned five episodes, the last of which was exclusive to the platform and aired on November 12.

Premise 
The show's concept revolves around BTS taking a break from their busy lives in the city and heading to a more peaceful, remote forest location—the Korean word  means "forest"—for a period of relaxation. The series' tagline, "between everyday life and rest", is reflected heavily throughout, as the band members follow no structured schedules while there and freely pursue various indoor and outdoor hobbies together and on their own. They are able to do "things they didn't do because they didn't want to take the time off", or "couldn't do because they [were] too busy", with minimal interference from or interaction with the production staff.

Cast 
 RM as himself
 Jin as himself
 Suga as himself
 J-Hope as himself
 Jimin as himself
 V as himself
 Jungkook as himself
 Bam (Jungkook's dog, season 2)

Broadcast and format 
VOD preorders for season one began on August 4, 2020, through the Weverse Shop e-commerce app—priced at ₩35,000/USD$27.99—and continued until August 19, just before the season premiere. An exclusive photo card set was included for free as a preorder bonus. The first episode aired on pay television network JTBC at 11PM KST on August 19. New episodes—eight in total at a runtime of 60 minutes each—were released every Wednesday night at that same time, and made available one hour later on Weverse (mobile app and website) at 12AM KST as exclusive subscription-based paid content with an extended runtime of 80 minutes. Additional 10-minute long clips featuring behind-the-scenes footage from each episode were uploaded to Weverse every following Tuesday at 9PM KST. 

Season two was announced on September 1, 2021. VOD preorders took place from September 23 through October 5 (early-bird), and then from October 6–15 (general)—at the same price as season one—with different bonuses offered for each purchase period. The season premiered on October 15 at 9PM KST on JTBC, and 10PM KST on Weverse, with new episodes released every Friday. The version that aired on television comprised only four episodes and ended on November 5. The Weverse version contained an exclusive fifth episode that became available on November 12. Behind-the-scenes footage from the season was released as a sixth 'episode' on the platform on November 19. Japanese television network TBS will begin domestic broadcasting of the season on March 25, 2023.

The series is available for viewing in 720p HD and 1080p FHD on the Weverse app and website, with subtitles provided in Korean, English, Japanese, and Chinese.

Production 

Season one of the series was produced by Big Hit Entertainment and Big Hit Three Sixty. Filming took place at a private lakeside property known as Lake 192, a popular airbnb site also used for hosting corporate workshops, family events, and small weddings. Located at Gail-ri, Sabuk-myeon, Chuncheon, in the Gangwon-do province, the property has featured in various media and commercials, and was awarded the "Korea Architecture Prize" for its modern design. The property consists of a two-storey, two-bedroom house (referred to in the series as the "Main House"), with a kitchen, living room, multiple terraces (one of which was used by the members for painting), and a large yard that also doubled as a camping site (Jin occasionally slept in a tent set up on the front lawn); a vegetable garden; a two-bedroom guesthouse located directly over the lake (referred to as the "floating house") with a surrounding terrace (used by the members for fishing and to dock the fishing boats); an additional one-storey, single-bedroom house (referred to as the "Upper House") with a living room area set up for gaming, a kitchen (most of the cooking during the series was done here), and an open gazebo that served as an outdoor eating area. The production staff made various modifications to the premises, including bringing in a campervan as an additional sleeping space; installing a large saltwater fish tank with flatfish; providing a 4 hp engine fishing boat; installing an outdoor pool and hot tub; setting up a boxing bag, exercise equipment, and goal post in the main yard; creating an outdoor eating area under a large tarp (referred to as "the Tarp") in the main yard.

Production for the second season took place on a much larger scale. Unlike the first season, which used a rented site for filming, Hybe purchased an undisclosed acreage of land surrounded by the mountains in Pyeongchang-gun, Gangwon-do—it also included a detached two-storey house (first floor: 120.72 m², second floor: 77.1 m²)—for ₩1.295 billion. The property underwent extensive remodeling and landscaping over the course of a year—work began when the first season ended—in preparation for the new season, and features a newly built tennis court—it is also used as a basketball and foot volleyball court—and an outdoor pool, among other amenities. The property contains three large, two-storey villas, the  biggest of which, referred to as "House A" in the series, is where the members congregated most often during their stay. The first floor contains an open kitchen and lounge, the living room, a gym, and a PC room equipped with a five-computer-setup for gaming. The upper floor contains a reading area, equipped with a small library, referred to as "the Study". The other two houses, referred to as "House B" and "House C" respectively, serve as sleeping accommodations, with three bedrooms in B (used by Jin, RM, and Suga), and four bedrooms in C (used by J-Hope, Jimin, Jungkook, and V). The lower part of the grounds, after the tennis court, is the camping zone: a large yard that houses the Airstream. The property is accessible by a private road through the mountains via smaller vehicles such as bicycles, vans, or ATVs (as seen in the series).

Episodes

Series overview

Season 1 (2020)

Season 2 (2021)

Reception 
Los Angeles Times writer Dakota Kim called In the Soop a "surprise" in comparison to other reality series the band has had. She wrote that the series "reveals another side of the fierce septet" through "serious heart-to-hearts" about how they were affected by the Covid-19 pandemic, while also providing "a view into rustic life, from the time-honored Korean tradition of cooking outdoors to learning how to fish." Claire P. Dodson of Teen Vogue described watching the series as "an extremely relaxing experience". BuzzFeeds Jenna Guillaume  felt that "'healing'...perfectly encapsulates the viewing experience", and described the series as "the perfect show to match [BTS]", writing that it was "low-stakes but incredibly compelling in its simplicity." In a 2021 round up of the band's various reality series over the years, Kayti Burt from Den of Geek called In The Soop "the gift that keeps on giving". She noted that the "much looser structure" of the series "allow[s] the band to relax a bit more", and wrote that "BTS has given us many gifts during the COVID-19 pandemic, but In the Soop may be the greatest." According to Twitter's year-end review, it was the eighth most-tweeted about show globally of 2021.

Ratings
BTS In the Soop aired on cable channel/pay TV network JTBC, which normally has a relatively smaller audience compared to free-to-air TV/public broadcasters such as KBS, SBS, MBC, and EBS.

Season 1

Season 2

Spin-offs
After BTS, In the Soop has gone on to feature K-pop group Seventeen in In the Soop SVT ver. for two seasons and the celebrity friend group of Park Seo-joon, Park Hyung-sik, Choi Woo-shik, Peakboy, and V of BTS in In the Soop: Friendcation.

Notes

References

External links 
 

BTS
South Korean reality television series